The Giants of the Prairies are a group of "world's biggest" roadside attractions found in Western Canada, especially in small towns populated mostly by Ukrainian Canadians.

List

In popular culture
These attractions are referenced in the Kubasonics song "Giants of the Prairies".

References

 
 Big Things
 Alberta Big Tour
 World's Largest and Large Things, Google map
 Canada's Largest Baseball Glove

Ukrainian-Canadian culture
Canada-related lists of superlatives
Tourist attractions in Canada